Noam Mills (born May 27, 1986) is an Israeli fencer, who competed in the individual women's épée event for Israel at the 2008 Summer Olympics in Beijing. She is a three-time junior Israeli champion in épée, and a four-time senior Israeli champion.

In 2006, she was the No. 1 ranked female junior épée fencer in the world, and won the épée title at the Junior World Fencing Championships. Mills won the silver medal in épée representing Israel at the 2007 Summer Universiade. Competing for the Harvard's Women's Fencing Team, she came in second in the NCAA Championships three times, in 2008-11. She also won the bronze medal at the 2010 European Fencing Championships in women's épée.

Early life
Mills was born in Hod Hasharon, and grew up in Kfar Saba, Israel, and is Jewish. She attended Mosenzon High School in Kfar Saba.

Fencing career
Mills began practicing fencing at the age of 11, and became a member of Hapoel Kfar Saba, a local fencing club in Israel. During her career, she won three junior national championship titles in épée. She won the Israel senior women's fencing épée championship four times, in 2005-08. Her coach in Israel has been Ohad Balva. Mills commented on fencing: "Being strong is not enough. Fencing is like playing chess while running a 100 metre race, and it is a chess part that I like most of all."

In 2006, she made her international debut by winning the épée title at the Junior World Fencing Championships. That year, Mills was the No. 1 ranked female junior épée fencer in the world.

Mills won a silver medal in épée representing Israel at the 2007 Summer Universiade in Bangkok, Thailand, losing out to Ukraine's Yana Shemyakina. Mills came in 7th in women's épée at the 2008 European Fencing Championships in Kiev, Ukraine.

Mills qualified for the 2008 Summer Olympics in Beijing, after finishing 7th at the 2007 European Fencing Championships in Prague, Czech Republic. She became the first female Israeli fencer to compete in the épée event at an Olympic level, despite falling short of the qualifying criteria by the Olympic Committee of Israel, as it allowed her to be added to the delegation by allocating to her one of the three spots it reserved for promising youngsters. Along with Emily Cross, she became the first Harvard University female fencers, and 14th and 15th in Ivy League history, to qualify for the Olympics.

Mills competed for Israel at the 2008 Olympics in Women's épée at the age of 22.  She faced three-time Olympic medalist Laura Flessel-Colovic of France in the First Round of the competition. Mills suffered an anticipated defeat with a score of 8–15, failing to advance into the next round.

After the Olympics, Mills pursued a bachelor's degree in economics, with a minor in neurobiology, at Harvard University. She competed as the member of Harvard's Women's Fencing Team, and as a freshman in 2008-09 came in second at the NCAA Fencing Championships in women's épée to Courtney Hurley. She was named a First-Team All-American, and All-Ivy League. As a sophomore in 2009-10, she was team captain and again came in second at the NCAA Fencing Championships. She was again named a First-Team All-American, and All-Ivy League. As a junior in 2010-11, she again came in second at the NCAA Fencing Championships, and was again an All-American. In 2011, she received the Ivy League NCAA Elite 89 Award, established by the NCAA to recognize the student-athlete with the highest cumulative grade-point average participating at the finals for each of the NCAA's 89 championships, with a 3.86 GPA.

In 2009, she took 7th at the 2009 European Fencing Championships in women's épée in Plovdiv, Bulgaria. Mills competed at the 2010 European Fencing Championships in Leipzig, Germany, where she won the bronze medal in individual épée. She lost 15-14 in the Round of 32 at the 2011 World Fencing Championships to eventual silver medalist, Sun Yujie of China.

See also
List of select Jewish fencers

References

External links
 
 Noam Mills at NBColympics.com (archived)

1986 births
Living people
Israeli female épée fencers
Jewish female épée fencers
Jewish sportswomen
Olympic fencers of Israel
Fencers at the 2008 Summer Olympics
Universiade medalists in fencing
Harvard University alumni
People from Hod HaSharon
People from Kfar Saba
Universiade silver medalists for Israel
Medalists at the 2007 Summer Universiade